The Roman Catholic Archdiocese of Jakarta is a Metropolitan Latin archdiocese on Java, in Indonesia.

Its cathedral episcopal see is the Assumption of the Blessed Virgin Mary Parish, in the national capital Jakarta.

History 
 Established on 8 May 1807 as the Apostolic Prefecture of Batavia, on territory split off from the Apostolic Prefecture of Islands of the Indian Ocean
 3 April 1841: Promoted as the Apostolic Vicariate of Batavia, hence entitled to a titular bishop 
 It lost vast territories frequently to various split-off missions: on 1855 to establish the Apostolic Prefecture of Labuan and Borneo, on 22 December 1902 to establish Apostolic Prefecture of Dutch New Guinea, on 11 February 1905 to establish Apostolic Prefecture of Dutch Borneo, 30 June 1911 to establish Apostolic Prefecture of Sumatra, 16 June 1913 to establish Apostolic Prefecture of Lesser Sunda Islands, 19 November 1919 to establish Apostolic Prefecture of Celebes (now Sulawesi), 27 April 1927 to establish Apostolic Prefecture of Malang, 15 February 1928 to establish Apostolic Prefecture of Surabaia, 20 April 1932 to establish Apostolic Prefecture of Bandung, 25 April 1932 to establish Apostolic Prefecture of Purwokerto, 25 June 1940 to establish Apostolic Vicariate of Semarang and 9 December 1948 to establish Apostolic Prefecture of Sukabumi
 On 7 February  1950 it was renamed after its see as the Apostolic Vicariate of Djakarta
 3 January 1961: Promoted as the Metropolitan Archdiocese of Djakarta, finally ceasing to be exempt (directly dependent on the Holy See)
 It enjoyed a papal visit by Pope Paul VI in February 1970.
 22 August 1973: renamed as the Metropolitan Archdiocese of Jakarta
 It enjoyed a papal visit by Pope John Paul II in October 1989.

Ordinaries

Apostolic Prefects of Batavia 
 Jacobus Nelissen (1808-1817)
 Lambertus Prinsen (1817-1830)

Apostolic Vicars of Batavia
 Johannes Scholten (1831-1842)
 Jacobus Grooff (1842-1852)
 Petrus Maria Vrancken (1852-1874)
 Adam Carel Claessens (1874-1893)
 Walterus Staal, S.J. (1893-1897)
 Edmondo Luypen, S.J. (1898-1923)
 Antonio Pietro Francesco van Velsen, S.J. (1924-1933)
 Pieter Jan Willekens, S.J. (1934-1950)

Apostolic Vicars of Djakarta
 Pieter Jan Willekens, S.J. (1950-1952)
 Adrianus Djajasepoetra, S.J. (1953-1961)

Archbishops of Djakarta
 Adrianus Djajasepoetra (1961-1970)
 Leo Soekoto, S.J. (1970-1973)

Archbishops of Jakarta
 Leo Soekoto (1973-1995)
 Julius Cardinal Darmaatmadja (1996-2010)
 Ignatius Cardinal Suharyo Hardjoatmodjo (2010-present)

Coadjutor Bishops
 Petrus Maria Vrancken (1847-1852)
 Ignatius Suharyo Hardjoatmodjo (2009-2010)

Ecclesiastical province 
Its Ecclesiastical province comprises the Metropolitan's own archdiocese and these Suffragan daughter dioceses, both also on Java island:
 Roman Catholic Diocese of Bandung 
 Roman Catholic Diocese of Bogor

See also 
 Catholic Church in Indonesia

Sources and external links
 GCatholic.org with incumbent biography links
 Catholic Hierarchy
 Official website

Roman Catholic dioceses in Indonesia
Religious organizations established in 1826
Roman Catholic dioceses and prelatures established in the 19th century
1826 establishments in the Dutch East Indies
Religion in Jakarta